Christian Kieckens (24 January 1951 – 11 May 2020) was a Belgian architect and also photographer and lecturer.

Kieckens was born in Aalst. In 1974 he graduated from the Sint-Lucas School of Architecture in Ghent.

From 2002 he had his own company, Christian Kieckens Architects, based in Brussels. He also taught at the Artesis Hogeschool Antwerpen. He died in Brussels.

Works 

 Students' center Maastricht
 Students' center Tilburg
 Bridge in Bruges
 Kortrijk Xpo
 Crematorium Zemst
 Publisher Sanderus, Oudenaarde ("indrukken uitdrukken")
 Architect museum

References

External links 

 Christian Kieckens Architects

Belgian architects
1951 births
2020 deaths
People from Aalst, Belgium